

Walter Stettner Ritter von Grabenhofen (18 March 1895 – 18 October 1944) was a German general in the Wehrmacht during World War II and a recipient of the Knight's Cross of the Iron Cross. In October 1944 he went missing in action on Mount Avala, near Belgrade in Serbia.

Biography
General von Stettner came from a well-respected military family. He fought in World War I, serving with the Bavarian Leib Regiment throughout.

He started World War II as commander of a Gebirgsjäger-Regiment and fought in Poland, Norway, Yugoslavia, and the Soviet Union, where his unit advanced into the Caucasus. On 17 December 1942, he replaced Hubert Lanz as commander of the 1st Mountain Division, when the Division was retreating to the Kuban Bridgehead, and in April 1943 he was awarded the Knight's Cross of the Iron Cross for his contribution to the defence of the Bridgehead. 

In April 1943, the 1st Mountain Division was transferred to Yugoslavia for anti-partisan operations. Still under Stettner's command, the division committed several war crimes in Yugoslavia and Greece, including the Massacres of Kommeno, Mousiotitsa, Lyngiades and the Massacre of the Italian Acqui Division.

Disappearance and aftermath
In October 1944, during the Soviet Belgrade Offensive, his unit was cut off and Stettner went missing in action, presumed killed on Mount Avala, near Belgrade.

He was described as a "small, meticulous man, who suffered a complex of inferiority and was driven by a tremendous sense of pride that led him to keep political opinions to himself. From his soldiers, he expected unwavering obedience to Hitler's orders. He dismissed the role of the military chaplaincy in the 1st Mountain Division. In the guidelines released for Operation "Augustus", Stettner required his soldiers to shoot on the spot any suspect who could potentially be connected to or suspected of partisan activities and to destroy all houses in their vicinity. This way of treating civilians in Epirus led to frequent frictions with his immediate superior, the devout Catholic General Hubert Lanz".

See also
List of people who disappeared

References

Sources
 This article is based on the one in German Wikipedia, Walter Stettner Ritter von Grabenhofen.''
 

1895 births
1940s missing person cases
1944 deaths
Gebirgsjäger of World War II
German mass murderers
German Army personnel killed in World War II
Lieutenant generals of the German Army (Wehrmacht)
Military personnel from Munich
Missing in action of World War II
Missing person cases in Europe
Nazi war criminals
Recipients of the Gold German Cross
Recipients of the Knight's Cross of the Iron Cross